Issikiomartyria distincta is a species of moth belonging to the family Micropterigidae. It was described by Hashimoto in 2006 and is endemic to Japan.

References

Micropterigidae
Moths described in 2006
Endemic fauna of Japan
Moths of Japan